"So Strange" is the fourth single by German synthpop band Cetu Javu, released in 1989. A shorter edited version of the song appeared on their 1990 debut album Southern Lands.

Track listings

12" vinyl
 ZYX Records / ZYX 6254-12

CD single
 GER: ZYX Records / ZYX 6254-8

References

1989 singles
Cetu Javu songs
1989 songs
ZYX Music singles